The John E. Walker Sr. Golf Course (often referred to as the Walker Course) is an 18-hole golf course on the campus of Clemson University in South Carolina.   Its signature 17th green and bunkers echo the university's tiger paw logo.

It is a stop on the Pier-Flats CAT Bus route.

In 2012, the Professional Golfers' Association of America ranked the Walker Course as the 9th best university golf course in the United States.

References

External links
Official website

Golf clubs and courses in South Carolina
College golf clubs and courses in the United States
Clemson University
Clemson Tigers sports venues
1995 establishments in South Carolina